Caïn is a French crime-television-series. In the U.S., the series is available on Walter Presents.

Content
Frédéric Caïn is a police officer with the rank of captain, who sits in a wheelchair since a self-inflicted motorcycle accident. He is a cynical man with a dark sense of humour, who likes to be on the verge of legality in his investigations and who attracts many people with his style. He is assisted by Lieutenant Lucie Delambre. Caïn's private life revolves around his ex-wife Gaëlle and his son Ben.

Cast
 Bruno Debrandt (Season 1-7)/Julien Baumgartner (Season 7-): Frederick Caïn
 Julie Delarme: Lucie Delambre
 Frédéric Pellegeay: Jacques Moretti
 Anne Suarez: Gaëlle
 Smadi Wolfman: Dr. Elizabeth Stunia
 Davy Sanna: Ben
 Jean-Yves Berteloot: Valentin Zuycker (5 Episodes)

Guest
 Sara Martins: Barbara Simon (Season 1, Episode 2)
 Pablo Pauly: Jordan (Season 1, Episode 7)
 Marie Kremer: Ornella (Season 2, Episode 2)
 Christine Citti: Jeanne Lestral (Season 2, Episode 5)
 Philippe Nahon: Stefano (Season 2, Episode 6)
 Francis Perrin: Barthes (Season 2, Episode 7)
 Bruno Wolkowitch: Mathias Very (Season 4, Episode 1)
 Mylène Demongeot: Jacqueline Benedetti (Season 5, Episode 2)
 Cristiana Reali: Florence Murat (Season 5, Episode 3)

References 

French police procedural television series
2012 French television series debuts
2010s French drama television series
Television shows set in France
2020s French drama television series
2020 French television series endings